Ronald Lee Reed (born November 2, 1942) is a former two-sport star who spent two seasons as a power forward in the National Basketball Association (NBA) before spending nearly two decades as a Major League Baseball pitcher.

Early life and education
Reed was born in LaPorte, Indiana, and was a baseball, basketball and football star at LaPorte High School. After high school, he received a contract offer from the Kansas City Royals, but chose, instead, to attended Notre Dame on a basketball scholarship.

Basketball career

Collegiate career
The 6’6″ forward set the Notre Dame single season rebounding record, averaging 17.7 a game his junior year. He averaged nineteen points and 14.3 rebounds a game over his college career on his way to being selected by the Detroit Pistons in the third round of the 1965 NBA draft. Shortly afterwards, he also signed as an amateur free agent to pitch for the Milwaukee Braves.

Professional career
Reed made his NBA debut with the Detroit Pistons in a 111–103 loss to the New York Knicks on October 16, 1965. He spent two seasons with the Pistons, and averaged 3.4 field goals per game. During the 1966–67 season, Reed informed head coach Dave DeBusschere (who was, himself, a two-sport star) that he had decided to pursue his baseball career. Regardless, he was selected 25th overall by the Seattle SuperSonics in the 1967 NBA Expansion Draft.

Baseball career

Minor leagues
Reed spent the  season in the high A Florida State League. In , he jumped all the way to triple A, while compiling a 13–5 record and 2.57 earned run average. He received a September call-up, and made his major league debut on September 26, 1966 against the San Francisco Giants. The fourth batter he faced, Willie McCovey, hit a two-run home run to give him the loss in his debut. He fared better in his second appearance. Starting against the Cincinnati Reds, he held them scoreless over six innings to pick up his first major league win. He spent the  season with the Richmond Braves, and went 14–10 with a 2.51 ERA. He again received a September call-up, and went 1–1 with a 2.95 ERA in three starts.

Atlanta Braves
Reed joined the Atlanta Braves out of Spring training . After three appearances out of the bullpen, Reed was moved into the starting rotation on April 29. He went 6–0 with a 1.73 ERA over his first six starts. His record fell to 8–4 with a 3.21 ERA by the All-Star break, but it was still good enough to earn him selection to the National League All-Star squad. Reed was one of six pitchers to hold the American League team scoreless.

He got the start in game two of the 1969 National League Championship Series against Jerry Koosman and the New York Mets. He surrendered four runs in just 1.2 innings to take the loss.

Reed spent five more seasons in Atlanta, going 49–66 with a 3.93 ERA and 490 strikeouts. He was the winning pitcher in the game in which Hank Aaron hit his 715th career home run, surpassing Babe Ruth for the all-time record.

St. Louis Cardinals
He was traded from the Braves to the St. Louis Cardinals for Ray Sadecki and Elias Sosa on May 28, . Bob Gibson's Hall of Fame career was in its twilight when the Cardinals acquired Reed to replace him in the rotation. His first start with his new club came against his former franchise, and he allowed two runs (0 earned) over seven innings to pick up the victory. He went 9–8 with a 3.23 ERA his only season in St. Louis. Between the Braves and the Cards, Reed pitched 250.1 innings, faced 1067 batters, and surrendered only five home runs.

Philadelphia Phillies
Reed was acquired by the Philadelphia Phillies from the Cardinals for Mike Anderson at the Winter Meetings on December 9, 1975. In 1975, the Phillies finished in second place, 6.5 games behind the Pittsburgh Pirates, in the National League East. In 1975, Phillies relief pitchers were 28–22 with a 3.21 ERA. The Phillies acquired Reed with the intention of using him as a right-handed complement to Tug McGraw at the back end of the bullpen.

His career in Philadelphia got off to a rocky start. Following a poor performance against his former Cardinals teammates on May 22, Reed's record stood at 2–1 with a 4.95 ERA, with one of his two wins being the result of having blown a save for starter Steve Carlton on April 24.

From there, he became rock solid. Through August, Reed went 6–3 with twelve saves and a 1.97 ERA, while holding batters to a .188 batting average. For the season, he and McGraw combined for 25 saves, and a 2.48 ERA to help the Phillies win 101 games, and take their division by nine games.

Unfortunately, this success did not carry into the post season. Trailing Cincinnati's "Big Red Machine" two games to zero in the 1976 National League Championship Series, the Phillies jumped to a 3–0 lead in game three of the series. Manager Danny Ozark handed Reed the ball in the seventh inning with runners on first and second with no outs. He allowed both inherited runners to score, as well as giving up two more runs to allow Cincinnati to take a 4–3 lead. The Phillies battled back to recapture a 6–4 lead, however, Reed surrendered back-to-back home runs to George Foster and Johnny Bench to lead off the ninth. Five batters later, Ken Griffey Sr.'s bases loaded single off Tom Underwood completed the three-game sweep for the Reds.

Reed emerged as one of the most dominant pieces of Danny Ozark's bullpen. Over the next two seasons, Reed went 10–9 with 32 saves and a 2.51 ERA to help the Phillies capture their division for three consecutive seasons (they were defeated in the National League Championship Series by the Los Angeles Dodgers both times).  was the first season of Reed's career that he did not make a single start. He did, however, amass a career high seventeen saves. In , Reed led MLB with thirteen relief wins.

Reed was the losing pitcher in game two of the 1980 National League Championship Series with the Houston Astros, however, he pitched shutout ball over the remainder of the post season, earning a save in game two of the World Series.

He also pitched in the inaugural National League Division Series in 1981 with Philadelphia (vs. Montreal); the Division Series format was adopted as a result of the players' strike. Reed's finest season in Philadelphia was his last. In , Reed pitched 95.2 innings, and went 9–1 with eight saves. He appeared in three of the five World Series games against the Baltimore Orioles. After the season, and shortly after his 41st birthday, Reed was traded to the Chicago White Sox for a player to be named later. The White Sox sent fellow 41-year-old Jerry Koosman to the Phillies to complete the trade.

Chicago White Sox
In his only season in Chicago, Reed was 0–6 with a 3.08 ERA. He was released the following spring, and retired.

Career statistics
Reed is one of fifteen pitchers in MLB history to have at least 100 wins and 100 saves. He is one of only five pitchers in MLB history to have 100 wins, 100 saves and 50 complete games. The other four are Ellis Kinder, Firpo Marberry, Dennis Eckersley and John Smoltz. Reed was 0–2 record with one save, and a 5.06 ERA over 32 innings in 22 postseason games.

Personal life
Reed is one of 13 athletes to have played in both the  National Basketball Association and Major League Baseball. The thirteen are: Danny Ainge,  Frank Baumholtz, Hank Biasatti, Gene Conley, Chuck Connors, Dave DeBusschere, Dick Groat, Steve Hamilton, Mark Hendrickson, Cotton Nash, Reed, Dick Ricketts and Howie Schultz.

In 1990, he was inducted into the Indiana Baseball Hall of Fame, and in 2005, he was inducted into National Polish-American Sports Hall of Fame.

References

External links
Baseball

Ron Reed at SABR (Baseball BioProject)
Ron Reed at Baseball Almanac
Ron Reed at Baseballbiography.com

Basketball
, or College Basketball at Sports-Reference.com

1942 births
Living people
American men's basketball players
American people of Polish descent
Atlanta Braves players
Baseball players from Indiana
Basketball players from Indiana
Chicago White Sox players
Detroit Pistons draft picks
Detroit Pistons players
Seattle SuperSonics expansion draft picks
Major League Baseball pitchers
National League All-Stars
Philadelphia Phillies players
People from La Porte, Indiana
Notre Dame Fighting Irish men's basketball players
St. Louis Cardinals players
Small forwards
Notre Dame Fighting Irish baseball players
West Palm Beach Braves players
Kinston Eagles players
Austin Braves players
Richmond Braves players
Shreveport Braves players